Futbolo Klubas Šilutė (before 2003, Laisvė Šilutė) is a Lithuanian football team from the city of Šilutė. The team plays in the II Lyga, third tier of Lithuanian football.

Participation in Lithuanian Championships 
 2003 – 3rd (I Lyga)
 2004 – 6th
 2005 – 6th
 2006 – 9th
 2007 – 9th
 2008 – 8th
 2009 – 1st (I Lyga)
 2010 – 8th (I Lyga)
 2011 – 8th (I Lyga)
 2011 – 7th (I Lyga)

Current squad 

As of 17 April 2016.

Managers history
In 2019, Bronius Mackevičius was confirmed as the new head coach of the club.

References

Silute
Silute, FK
1991 establishments in Lithuania